Paul Rooney (born 1967 in Liverpool) is an English artist who works with music and words, primarily through installations and records.

He studied painting at Edinburgh College of Art. In the late 1990s his art practice shifted from painting to music, initially with the band Rooney and their three experimental lo-fi punk pop albums about everyday life. His work later focussed on music within gallery installations, performances and video works.

His art works often explore the difficulties inherent in the representation of 'place'. The curator Claire Doherty wrote that: "Rooney asserts [the] occupation of place through real and fictional occurrences, acknowledging the overlooked and proposing the equal status of urban myth and lived experience."

Rooney was the winner of Art Prize North in 2003, the Northern Art Prize in 2008, and the Morton Award for Lens Based Work in 2012. His works have been purchased for the Arts Council Collection and through the Contemporary Art Society Acquisitions Scheme.

Work 
The three CD music albums released from 1998 to 2000 under the band name Rooney (not the later US band of the same name) were broadcast by BBC Radio 1 (John Peel Show) amongst others, and the track Went to Town reached number 44 in John Peel's Festive Fifty of 1998. All of the Rooney songs were centred around lyrics describing banal events, everyday objects or mundane jobs, with home-recorded lo-fi music exalting/disrupting these observations in various ways. As well as a solo recording project, Rooney became a live band in time to record a Peel session in 1999, but the project ended after a third album was released in 2000.

Paul Rooney continued to perform or work with other musicians in the early 2000s, such as The NWRA House Band, touring a 'variety night' and a 'rock opera' amongst other performance projects. His gallery works — now primarily sound/music based installations but also including video and writing — developed through commissions for organisations such as Sound and Music and Film and Video Umbrella, and through a period of residencies and fellowships at institutions in the UK (including Tate Liverpool and Oxford University,) and abroad, from Havana to Melbourne.

Electric Earth: Film and Video from Britain, a British Council exhibition which toured internationally from 2003, included early music/video work by Rooney. In 2004 he curated Pass the Time of Day, a UK touring exhibition dealing with the relationship between music and 'the everyday'. Pass the Time of Day included works by Arab Strap, Fugazi and Jem Cohen, Mark Leckey, Rodney Graham, Susan Philipsz and Phil Collins amongst others. The following year Rooney's work was selected for the survey show British Art Show 6, which toured the UK in 2005–2006. Rooney had solo shows at venues such as Site Gallery, Sheffield (a two-person show with Susan Philipsz, 2003); and Matt's Gallery, London (2008).

He returned to releasing records in 2007 with the red vinyl 12" Lucy Over Lancashire, on SueMi Records of Berlin, a dub anti-hymn to North West England. Released under his full name of 'Paul Rooney', it was specifically made for broadcast on BBC Radio Lancashire,  but BBC Radio 1 and BBC 6 Music were amongst the other stations who broadcast the piece (despite it being 16 minutes long), and it reached number 5 in that year's Festive Fifty, now organised by Dandelion Radio.

In 2012 Rooney had a solo show in the Liverpool Biennial official programme, and later that year, at London's Sunday Art Fair, he launched Dust and Other Stories, a collection of short fiction published by Akerman Daly/Aye-Aye Books.

The Rooney Peel session was repeated in 2016 on Gideon Coe's BBC 6 Music show, and in 2017 Rooney's first album for seventeen years, Futile Exorcise, was released on Owd Scrat Records on transparent vinyl. The album was on Stewart Lee's list of best records of 2017 and a track from it, Lost High Street, reached number 1 on the 2017 Dandelion Radio Festive Fifty.

References

External links 
 Official website

1967 births
Living people
English contemporary artists
British sound artists
British video artists
Alumni of the Edinburgh College of Art
Alumni of Heriot-Watt University
Artists from Liverpool